Irvin Martin Smith Jr. (born August 9, 1998) is an American football tight end for the Minnesota Vikings of the National Football League (NFL). He played college football at Alabama and was drafted in second round of the 2019 NFL Draft by the Vikings.

Early years
Smith Jr. was born in New Orleans, Louisiana on August 9, 1998.  Shortly after being born, he moved to Arizona where he spent the first 14 years of his life.  Smith Jr. moved back to New Orleans at age 14 and attended Brother Martin High School in New Orleans, Louisiana, where he played high school football. As a senior, he had 31 receptions for 558 yards and four touchdowns. He originally committed to Texas A&M University to play college football, but changed to the University of Alabama.

College career
After not recording a reception as a true freshman at Alabama in 2016, Smith Jr, had 14 receptions for 128 yards and three touchdowns over 14 games as a sophomore in 2017. He returned to Alabama as a starter in 2018.  On January 11, 2019, Smith announced that he would declare for the 2019 NFL Draft.

College statistics

Professional career

Smith Jr. was drafted by the Minnesota Vikings in the second round with the 50th overall pick in the 2019 NFL Draft.

2019
Smith made his NFL debut in Week 1 against the Atlanta Falcons but did not record any meaningful statistics. He recorded his first reception in the next game against the Green Bay Packers. He recorded a season-high and team-leading 60 receiving yards on three receptions against the Oakland Raiders in the following game. He scored his first professional touchdown in Week 11 against the Denver Broncos on a 10-yard reception from Kirk Cousins. Overall, as a rookie, he appeared in all 16 games and started six. He recorded 36 receptions for 311 receiving yards and two receiving touchdowns.

2020
In Week 9, against the Detroit Lions, Smith had two receiving touchdowns in the same game for his first multi-touchdown game as a professional.
In Week 16 against the New Orleans Saints on Christmas Day, Smith recorded 6 catches for 53 yards and 2 touchdowns during the 52–33 loss.

2021
On September 1, 2021, it was revealed that Smith underwent surgery to repair a torn meniscus, which would potentially cost him the entire 2021 season. He was placed on injured reserve on September 1, 2021.

2022
On November 1, 2022, Smith was placed on injured reserve after suffering an ankle injury in the Week 8 win over the Arizona Cardinals. He was activated on January 7, 2023.

Personal life
His father, Irv Smith Sr., played college football at the University of Notre Dame and in the NFL for the New Orleans Saints, San Francisco 49ers, and Cleveland Browns.

References

External links
Minnesota Vikings bio
Alabama Crimson Tide bio

1998 births
Living people
Players of American football from New Orleans
American football tight ends
Alabama Crimson Tide football players
Minnesota Vikings players
Brother Martin High School alumni